Freeman Briley Ransom (1880–1947) was a lawyer and businessman in Indianapolis, Indiana. He was born on his family's farm in Grenada, Mississippi as one of eleven children.  He became a lawyer, businessman, and civic activist practicing in Indianapolis, Indiana. From 1910 until his death he served as legal counsel to Madam C. J. Walker and the Madame C.J. Walker Manufacturing Company. He is buried in West Ridge Park Cemetery in Indianapolis. Robert Brokenburr was his law partner.

Education
After graduating from Grenada's black high school, Ransom graduated from Walden University in Nashville, Tennessee in 1908 with degrees in divinity and law and as valedictorian of both classes.   He completed post graduate work in the School of Law at Columbia University.

Madame C.J. Walker Manufacturing Company
Soon after his move to Indianapolis, Ransom became not only Madame Walker's attorney but also the general manager for the Madame C.J. Walker Manufacturing Company. Under his leadership, the company became a national model for entrepreneurship in the United States and abroad in the African-American business community and far beyond.

Other Indianapolis clients and service
As the Walker Company grew in scale, so did Ransom's stature in the city.  He became the attorney for a number of Indianapolis businesses and civic organizations. He also held a number of civic and elected positions including: 
Indianapolis City Councilman
President of Flanner House
State School for the Blind Trustee
Democratic National Convention Alternate Delegate
Bethel African Methodist Episcopal Church Trustee
Legal consultant to the National Association for the Advancement of Colored People

Madame Walker Theatre
On land purchased for $58,000 in 1924, Ransom worked alongside A'Lelia Walker to construct a building in honor of Madame Walker.  The Walker Theatre was built to "serve as the social and cultural center of Indianapolis." The theatre opened its doors on Monday, December 26, 1927.

Indianapolis legacy
Ransom and his family lived much of their life in Indianapolis near Indiana Avenue in what is now called the Ransom Place Historic District.  The district was named for him and his family in 1992, and became the first African-American neighborhood in the state of Indiana to receive such distinction. The neighborhood, which was home to many important African American business leaders, remains the most intact 19th century neighborhood associated with African Americans in Indianapolis.

On the campus of Indiana University-Purdue University Indianapolis, there is an apartment complex which bears the family name.

In popular culture
Ransom was prominently featured in the Netflix's 2020 mini-series Self Made, telling the story of Madam Walker, in which he was portrayed by Kevin Carroll.

See also

 A'Lelia Walker

References

1880 births
1947 deaths
African-American activists
African-American businesspeople
African-American lawyers
20th-century American lawyers
Burials in Indiana
Columbia Law School alumni
Executives of Indiana based companies
Indiana lawyers
People from Grenada, Mississippi
Businesspeople from Indianapolis
Walden University (Tennessee) alumni
20th-century American businesspeople